This article lists the winners and nominees for the NAACP Image Award for Outstanding Actress in a Television Movie, Mini-Series or Dramatic Special. Currently, Alfre Woodard holds the record for most wins in this category with six.

Winners and nominees
Winners are listed first and highlighted in bold.

1970s

1980s

1990s

2000s

2010s

2020s

Multiple wins and nominations

Wins

 6 wins
 Alfre Woodard

 4 wins
 Cicely Tyson

 3 wins
 Lynn Whitfield
 Queen Latifah

 2 wins
 Angela Bassett
 Halle Berry
 Taraji P. Henson
 Regina King

Nominations

 7 nominations
 Alfre Woodard

 6 nominations
 Angela Bassett
 Cicely Tyson

 5 nominations
 Halle Berry
 Lynn Whitfield

 4 nominations
 Regina King
 Queen Latifah
 Keke Palmer
 Jill Scott
 Vanessa Williams
 Aunjanue Ellis

 3 nominations
 Ruby Dee
 Phylicia Rashad
 Anika Noni Rose
 Gabrielle Union
 Kerry Washington

 2 nominations
 Vanessa Bell Calloway
 Loretta Devine
 Carmen Ejogo
 Kimberly Elise
 Whoopi Goldberg
 Taraji P. Henson
 Audra McDonald
 S. Epatha Merkerson
 Rosie Perez
 Octavia Spencer

References

NAACP Image Awards
Television awards for Best Actress